CNSL may refer to:
Canadian National Soccer League
Cashew nutshell liquid